Ceres (also, Hopewell) is an unincorporated community in Crawford County, Georgia, United States.

History
The community was named after Ceres, the Roman goddess of agriculture, grain crops, fertility and motherly relationships.

References

Unincorporated communities in Crawford County, Georgia
Unincorporated communities in Georgia (U.S. state)